Sultanate of Deli (Indonesian: Kesultanan Deli Darul Maimoon;) was a 1,820 km² Malay state in east Sumatra founded in 1630. A tributary kingdom from 1630 it was controlled by various Sultanates until 1814, when it became an independent sultanate and broke away from the Sultanate of Siak.

The ruler of Aceh converted to Islam in the mid-15th century. The Sultanate of Aceh was founded by Ali Mughayat Syah, who began campaigns to extend his control over northern Sumatra in 1520. The sultan Iskandar Muda expanded Aceh by conquest.  In 1612 Deli was militarily defeated and annexed. Dutch intervention in 1861, which resulted in a contract with the Dutch East Indies the following year, helped to recognise Deli's independence from Aceh and Siak.

Now part of North Sumatra, Indonesia, the sultanate remains as a symbol of the history of Medan.

History

The history of the Sultanate of Deli and also the Sultanate of Serdang are closely related to the heyday of the Sultanate of Aceh Darussalam during the administration of Sultan Iskandar Muda (1607–1636). Aceh Darussalam started its expansion in 1612 by invading the cities along the East Coast of Sumatra. Deli harbour was conquered in six weeks, while the Kingdom of Aru surrendered in early 1613 AD. The Kingdom of Aru, located in East Sumatra, was called the Kingdom of Haru, in some works such as those of Tuanku Luckman Sinar Basarshah II who frequently wrote about the history of the kingdoms of East Sumatra.

Aceh Darussalam's conquest was led by Muhammad Dalik who assumed a title as Sri Paduka Tuanku Gocah Pahlawan. This Aceh Darussalam commander was a descendant of Amir Muhammad Badar ud-din Khan, a nobleman from India who married Princess Chandra Dewi, daughter of the Sultan of Samudera Pasai. Sri Paduka Tuanku Gocah Pahlawan nicknamed Laksamana Kuda Bintan (Admiral Horse of Bintan) was also believed to have led Aceh Darussalam troops against the Portuguese in 1629 and to have then conquered Pahang (1617), Kedah (1620), and Nias (1624), as well as some other areas.

Sri Paduka Tuanku Gocah Pahlawan, founder of the Sultanate of Deli 
Sultan Iskandar Muda granted Aru territory to Sri Paduka Tuanku Gocah Pahlawan. In 1632, Sri Paduka Tuanku Gocah Pahlawan was appointed the vice of Sultan Iskandar Muda to rule the former territory of Aru. Acehnese interests in the occupation of the former Kingdom of Aru territory were.
 To destroy the remaining resistance of the Kingdom of Aru which was aided by Portuguese;
 Spread the teachings of Islam into interior areas, and
 Establish rule that was part of the Aceh Darussalam.

Shortly after being appointed ruler of Aru territory representing the Sultan of Aceh, Sri Paduka Tuanku Gocah Pahlawan was appointed by the four kings of the Batak Karo urung (country) as a Datuk Tunggal or Ulon Janji, which was a position with an authority equivalent to the position of prime minister or grand vizier. In the coronation, an oath to obey was pronounced by the Orang-orang Besar and people for Sri Paduka Tuanku Gocah Pahlawan. At the same time, Lembaga Datuk Berempat was also established that served as an advisory council for the government of Sri Paduka Tuanku Gocah Pahlawan. The four Batak Karo kings became members of this institution.

The four kings of Batak Karo were the leaders of the four kingdoms in the Batak Karo region that had accepted the teaching of Islam and conquered by the Sultanate of Aceh Darussalam in the conquest led by Sri Paduka Tuanku Gocah Pahlawan. One of the four Batak Karo kings is King Undo Sunggal who is also father-in-law of Sri Paduka Tuanku Gocah Pahlawan. In 1632, Sri Paduka Tuanku Gocah Pahlawan married King Undo Sunggal's daughter, named Princess Nang Baluan Beru Surbakti.

Sri Paduka Tuanku Gocah Pahlawan died in 1641, and the control over Deli was bequeathed to his son, Tuanku Panglima Perunggit titled Panglima Deli. Meanwhile, Sultan Iskandar Muda had died in 1636 AD in Aceh. The leadership of Sultanate of Aceh Darussalam was passed to Sultan Iskandar Muda son-in-law, Sultan Iskandar Thani, who was on the throne until 1641.

Aceh Darussalam weakened after Sultan Iskandar Thani died. His successor was also his wife and the daughter of Sultan Iskandar Muda, Sultanah Safi al-Din Taj al-Alam (Puteri Sri Alam). The unstable Aceh Darussalam was an opportunity for Tuanku Panglima Perunggit. In 1669, Tuanku Panglima Perunggit proclaimed independence from the Sultanate of Aceh Darussalam and established a connection with the Dutch in Malacca (Basarshah II, nd: 50). Thus, officially the Sultanate of Deli established a sovereign government with the capital in Labuhan, located approximately 20 kilometres from Medan, the capital of North Sumatra province today.

The name of Deli had actually been listed in the archives of the VOC (Dutch East India Company) in Malacca, in the record of April 1641. This was the year when the Dutch seized Malacca from the Portuguese. In that record, it was stated that according to the report of the admiral of Johor, Aceh army had gathered in Kuala Deli. At that time, the Sultanate of Aceh Darussalam was involved in a conflict with the Sultanate of Johor which previously assisted the Portuguese and then the Dutch.

Another Dutch archive that mentions Deli is a record dated 9 September 1641 containing a letter from Sultanah Safi al-Din Taj al-Alam to the Governor-General Antonio van Diemen (1636–1645) in Batavia. In her letter, the Sultanah stated that the Dutch could trade up to Deli and Besitang. According to the VOC record in October 1644, a ruler titled Tuanku Panglima Deli had sent letters and gifts to the Dutch in Malacca, but the group's envoy had been robbed in Deli near Penaji River, the area of Malacca.

The fragmentation of the royal family of the Sultanate of Deli 

The Deli Sultan after Sri Paduka Tuanku Gocah Pahlawan, Tuanku Panglima Perunggit or Panglima Deli, died in 1700. His successor was Tuanku Panglima Paderap who ruled until 1720. The Sultanate of Deli was shaken by internal fragmentation shortly after Tuanku Panglima Paderap died. The deceased's children made a fuss about who should be entitled to occupy the position as the next Sultan of Deli.

Despite his status as the oldest child, Tuanku Jalaludin Gelar Kejuruan Metar was excluded from the candidates for the throne of the Sultanate of Deli because his eyes were impaired. This situation made Tuanku Panglima Pasutan, second son of the late Tuanku Panglima Paderap, willing to take over the throne despite the fact that the right to assume the next leadership was to Tuanku Umar Johan Alamsyah Gelar Kejeruan Junjongan (fourth son) because he was born from the queen. There was a civil war between the two sons. Meanwhile, Tuanku Tawar (Arifin) Gelar Kejuruan Santun chose to avoid the war between the two brothers and opened a country in Denai which later expanded to Serbajadi.

In the civil war that culminated in 1732, Tuanku Panglima Pasutan beat Tuanku Umar Johan Alamsyah Gelar Kejeruan Junjongan out of the palace. Tuanku Umar Johan Alamsyah Gelar Kejeruan Junjongan was forced with his mother, Tuanku Panglima Sampali (the queen of Tuanku Panglima Paderap), to take refuge until they arrived at a place later called Kampung Besar (Serdang). Therefore, Tuanku Panglima Pasutan freely declared himself as the new Sultan of Deli.

Meanwhile, Tuanku Umar Johan Alamsyah Gelar Kejeruan Junjongan did not relax and got ready to establish the Sultanate of Serdang. This later sultanate came into existence because of the strong supports to Tuanku Umar Johan Alamsyah, especially from two Batak Karo kings, Raja Urung Sunggal and Raja Urung Senembah. In addition, Raja Urung Batak Timur that ruled the upper part of Serdang region in Tanjong Morawa and a high rank man from Aceh named Kejeruan Lumu helped support the establishment of Serdang. Finally, in 1723 Tuanku Umar Johan Alamsyah Gelar Kejeruan Junjongan was crowned as the first sultan as well as the founder of the Sultanate of Serdang (Basarshah II, nd: 55). The third son of the late Tuanku Panglima Paderap, Tuanku Tawar (Arifin) Kejeruan Santun, who had founded the country in Denai, then combined his territory with Serdang.

Deli internal conditions that have not been stable made Deli region a target for a number of imperial states that were competing for influences. Monarchies that had tried to master the Sultanate of Deli were the Sultanate of Siak Sri Inderapura, the Sultanate of Johor, and the Sultanate of Aceh Darussalam which was apparently still wanted to colonise Deli again.

Deli region considered very profitable, especially because of its natural resources. Deli was well known for its perfume, sandalwood, and camphor. In addition, the Dutch brought rice, candles, and horses from Deli. Due to their economic interests, the Dutch felt the need to maintain good relations with the authority and they also brought textiles from Deli.

Tuanku Panglima Pasutan, the fourth Sultan of Deli died in 1761. The government of the Sultanate of Deli was continued by Kanduhid who assumed the title as Panglima Gandar Wahid. In 1805, Panglima Gandar Wahid died. His successor was Tuanku Amaluddin. Because at that time the Sultanate of Deli was still under the influence of the Sultanate of Siak Sri Inderapura, the coronation of Tuanku Amaluddin as the Sultan of Deli was based on a certificate dated 8 August 1814 issued by the sultan of Siak. After officially becoming the Sultan of Deli, Tuanku Panglima Amaludin obtained an honorary title as Sultan Panglima Mangedar Alam.

Meuraxa in Sekitar Suku Melaju, Batak, Atjeh, dan Keradjaan Deli (1956) writes that in 1669 the territory of the Sultanate of Deli was captured by the Sultanate of Siak Sri Inderapura from the Sultanate of Aceh Darussalam. However, when the Sultanate of Siak Sri Inderapura was subjected to the Sultanate of Johor, the Deli Sultanate territory was under the control of Johor.

In 1854, Aceh ruled again over the Sultanate of Deli, led by a commander named Teuku Husin. Sultan Osman Perkasa Alam Shah (1850–1858), the Sultan of Deli at the time, was taken to the Palace of Aceh Darussalam. But then Deli was acknowledged again as auspices of the Sultanate of Aceh Darussalam, who was then ruled by Sultan Sulaiman Shah (1838–1857).

By Aceh Darussalam, the Sultanate of Deli territory was defined between the borders of Rokan to the south to the border of Tamiang.

Existence of the Sultanate of Deli 

The civil war between the Sultanate of Deli and Serdang ended in the early 20th century after pressure from the Dutch (rays, 2007:24). The relationship between the Sultanate of Deli and the Dutch went pretty consistent as they needed each other: the Dutch brought different types of natural resources from Deli, while Deli needs security guarantees.

"Harmony" between the Sultanate of Deli and the Dutch East Indies colonial government increasingly stronger during the period when Deli was under the influence of the Sultanate of Siak Sri Inderapura. Throughout August 1862, Elisa Netscher who served as the Resident of Riau, accompanied by the Assistant Resident of Siak and some rulers of the Sultanate of Siak, travelling to countries in East Sumatra. This trip was made at the request of the Sultanate of Siak because several kingdoms in East Sumatra were reluctant to acknowledge Siak's power over those countries, including Deli. The countries in East Sumatra tend to get closer to the Sultanate of Aceh because Siak was considered too weak.

On 21 August 1862, Elisha Netscher group entered Kuala Sungai Deli and was greeted by Sultan Mahmud Al Rashid Perkasa Alam Shah. To those guests, the Sultan of Deli proclaimed that the Sultanate of Deli was no longer having to do with the Sultanate of Siak and did not ask for recognition from anyone. However, Netscher continuously persuaded so that the influence of Siak Sri Inderapura over Deli would not lost by declaring that "the State Deli follows Siak and they together protected by the Dutch East Indies government". Since then, the government of Sultanate of Deli was tied in a political contract with the Dutch East Indies colonial government.

The regime of Sultan Mahmud Al Rashid Perkasa Alam Shah ended in 1873 and was succeeded by his son whom assumed a title as Sultan Makmun Al Rashid Perkasa Alam. During the leadership of the ninth sultan, Deli experienced period of prosperity which was mainly derived from tobacco plantation sector and the growth of Deli Company and other foreign entrepreneurs who opened tobacco plantations in Deli region. In 1872, 13 foreign-owned plantations operated in Deli. Deli soil was suitable for growing tobacco and producing world-class quality tobacco. Tobacco was sold in the European market for cigar making.

When Sultan Mahmud Al Rashid Perkasa Alam Shah began to occupy the throne of the Sultanate of Deli in 1873, the number of tobacco plantations in Deli had increased to 44 estates. Tobacco crops harvested the next year reached 125,000 packs and made Deli as one of the largest tobacco producers in the world and Amsterdam became the largest tobacco market in the world. Payment from the plantations and land rents from foreign entrepreneurs made the Sultan of Deli very rich.

At this time, Sultan Mahmud Al Rashid Perkasa Alam Shah built a symbol of the triumph of the Sultanate of Deli, among others, Kampong Bahari (Labuhan) in 1886 and the Maimoon Grand Palace in 1888 (Sinar, 2007:100). His successor, Sultan Ma`mun Al Rashid Perkasa Alam Shah, who reigned since 1873, continued the development of the symbols of greatness by founding the building of Mahkamah Kerapatan Besar in 1903 and the Great Mosque of Sultan Al Mansun in 1906. Maimoon Palace was built in what is now the centre of Medan City administration and inhabited by the sultans of Deli and their families since 18 May 1891. Earlier, the sultans and his family lived in Kampong Bahari in Labuhan. The architect of this palace was a KNIL soldier (Koninklijk Nederlandsche Indische Leger, Dutch East Indies colonial army) named Captain 

After Indonesia proclaimed its independence in 1945 and gained independence by the Netherlands in 1949, the Sultanate of Deli, which was originally included in the territory of East Sumatra, since 1950 was merged into the province of North Sumatra until now. On the other hand, in those days situation in Deli and North Sumatra have not been in a truly peaceful state. Royal families in northern Sumatra, including the Deli family, were threatened because of the opposition from the anti-roya parties. The royal family at that time was considered as Dutch stooges and belonging to the feudal class.

Still in the same book, Tengku Luckman Sinar also writes that the rebellion incitements had been rumoured since June 1942 during the era of Japanese occupation in Indonesia. The rebellion was started when the farmers harvested the rice, which was done with mutual co-operation and ended with the harvest feast.

Acts of violence against the nobility reached its peak during the bloody incident known as the Social Revolution in 1946. Many kings and royal family in North Sumatra were murdered and robbed of property and belongings, including Tengku Amir Hamzah, the Indonesian poet who was beheaded in Kuala Begumit. The family of the Sultanate of Deli and Serdang survived thanks to the preservation of the Allied soldiers who were on duty in the field to accept the surrender of the Japanese. After the tragedy of the Social Revolution ended in 1946, the family and heirs of the Sultanate of Deli occupied Maimoon Palace as a residence since almost all the palace there had been destroyed or burned. Maimoon Palace was the only remaining palace because at the time of the Social Revolution it was guarded by Allied soldiers.

After revolution and independence the Sultanate of Deli still exists but no longer has any political authority. Entering the New Order era, the sultanate was ruled by Sultan Azmy Perkasa Alam Alhaj who was on the throne from 1967 until 1998. Since 5 May 1998, Sultan Otteman Mahmud Perkasa Alam served as functionary of the sultanate. However, the 13th sultan of Deli who was a lieutenant colonel in Indonesian Army died in an Army CN235 plane crash at Malikus Saleh Airport, Lhokseumawe, Aceh, on 21 July 2005. On 22 July 2005, the Crown Prince inherited the throne as the 14th sultan of Deli and assumed the title as Sultan Mahmud Lamanjiji Perkasa Alam.

The lineage of the Sultans

 Tuanku Panglima Gocah Pahlawan (1632–1669).
 Tuanku Panglima Perunggit (1669–1698).
 Tuanku Panglima Paderap (1698–1728).
 Tuanku Panglima Pasutan (1728–1761).
 Tuanku Panglima Gandar Wahid (1761–1805).
 Sultan Amaluddin Mangendar (1805–1850).
 Sultan Osman Perkasa Alam Shah (1850–1858).
 Sultan Mahmud Al Rashid Perkasa Alamsyah (1858–1873).
 Sultan Ma'mun Al Rashid Perkasa Alamyah (1873–1924).
 Sultan Amaluddin Al Sani Perkasa Alamsyah (1924–1945).
 Sultan Osman Al Sani Perkasa Alamsyah (1945–1967).
 Sultan Azmy Perkasa Alam Alhaj (1967–1998).
 Sultan Otteman Mahmud Perkasa Alam (5 May 1998 – 21 July 2005).
 Sultan Mahmud Lamanjiji Perkasa Alam (since 22 July 2005 – present).

Family Tree

Territory 

The Sultanate of Deli territory included Labuhan Deli, Langkat, Suka Piring, Buluh Cina, Denai, Serbajadi, and several other countries around the east coast of Sumatra Island. When the Sultanate of Aceh Darussalam regained control in 1854, the Sultanate of Deli was proclaimed independent under the control of Aceh Darussalam and its territory was assigned between the borders of Rokan to the south to the border of Tamiang (Meuraxa, 1956:25).

During the Dutch colonial government, according to the political contract between the Sultanate of Deli with the colonial government, the sultanate's territories included:
 The area under the direct rule of the sultan (kotapraja/capital).
 Urung (State) XII Kota Hamparan Perak led by Datuk Hamparan Perak Setia Diraja.
 Urung Serbanyaman-Sunggal led by Datuk Sunggal Sri Indera Pahlawan.
 Urung Sukapiring-Kampung Baru led by Datuk Sukapiring Sri Indera Asmara.
 Urung Senembah-Petumbak led by Kejeruan Senembah Deli.
 Percut State led by Kejeruan Percut Paduka Raja.
 Jajahan Negeri Bedagai led by Pangeran Nara Kelana Raja Bedagai.
 Jajahan Negeri Padang led by Maharaja Negeri Padang (Sinar, 2007:29–30).

In general, the sultanate's territory was divided into two, namely the Hilir region which was inhabited by Malay people who had been converted to Islam, and Hulu region which was inhabited by Karo tribes who mostly had not been converted to Islam or still held the faith of their ancestors.

Governance system 

Since founded by Tuanku Sri Paduka Tuanku Gocah Pahlawan, the Sultanate of Deli already had Lembaga Datuk Berempat that served as a government advisory board. At that time, Lembaga Datuk Berempat consisted of four Karo Batak King that had supported Deli since its declaration as an independent kingdom. Lembaga Datuk Berempat also had a central role in the coronation ceremony of Deli sultans.

As the supreme authority, the Sultan of Deli did not only perform his duties as a head of state and government, but also served as the chief of religious affairs as well as Malays custom chief. In executing his duty, the Sultan of Deli was aided by treasurer, harbormaster, and the imperial servants whom each have their specific roles and duties.

During the Dutch colonial era, the governmental system of the Sultanate of Deli was tied through a political agreement. Sejarah Medan Tempo Doeloe (2007), written by Tengku Luckman Sinar, mentions that the political agreement between the Dutch and the Sultanate of Deli was divided into:

 Acte van Verband (Confinement Certificate). The certificate mentioned that:
 the Sultan of Deli, as well as his successor, willing to execute the agreement between the Dutch and the Sultanate of Deli,
 the Sultan of Deli will be obedient and loyal to the Netherlands Queen/Governor-General of the Dutch East Indies and implemented appropriate governance according to Deli's custom and regulations,
 the Sultan of Deli willing to promote the country and the people, and
 the Sultan of Deli willing to comply with additional requirements that were not yet clear or not listed in the certificate. This certificate was signed by Dutch government officials and Orang-orang Besar of Deli as witnesses.

 Acte van Bevestiging (Deed of Confirmation). This certificate stated that the Dutch Government (Governor-General) acknowledged the Sultan as the king of Deli and this recognition was also mentioned in the Ordinance of the Dutch East Indies.

The governance of the Sultanate of Deli was executed by the Sultan of Deli, together with the Dewan Orang-orang Besar (as a replacement for the Lembaga Datuk Berempat) which consisted of four Urung and Kejeruan Percut after consultation and with the guidance of the Resident as the representative of the Dutch East Indies colonial government. The Orang-orang Besar was appointed and dismissed by the Sultan of Deli after consulted the Resident with respect to customs regulations. In addition, the Resident had the right to attend meetings of the Orang-orang Besar (Sinar, 2007:30). The Sultanate of Deli also had several important institutions supporting the governance. Some of them were the judiciary or Kerapatan Besar, Autonomous Police of Deli, and the Religious Courts.

See also

 Deli Serdang Regency
 Sultanate of Serdang

Notes

References
 J.M. Barwise and N.J. White. A Traveller’s History of Southeast Asia. New York: Interlink Books, 2002.
 M.C. Ricklefs. A History of Modern Indonesia Since c. 1300, 2nd ed. Stanford: Stanford University Press, 1994.
 “Ringkasan Sejarah Kesultanan Asahan dari Abad XVI”, available at kesultananasahan.com, data accessed on 24 November 2009.
 Budisantoso, et al. 1985. Masyarakat Melayu Riau dan kebudayaannya. Pekanbaru: Pemerintah Propinsi Daerah Tingkat I Riau.
 Denys Lombard. 2007. Kerajaan Aceh zaman Sultan Iskandar Muda (1607-1636). Translated from French into Indonesian by Winarsih Arifin from original book Le Sultanat d`Atjeh au temps d`Iskandar Muda (1607-1636). Jakarta: Kepustakaan Populer Gramedia.
 Dada Meuraxa. 1956. Sekitar suku Melaju, Batak, Atjeh, dan keradjaan Deli. Medan: Pengetahuan.
 Marwati Djoened Poesponegoro & Nugroho Notosusanto. 1982. Sejarah Nasional Indonesia, Jilid 4. Jakarta: Proyek Inventarisasi dan Dokumentasi Sejarah Nasional.
 Tengku Luckman Sinar. “Sejarah Awal Kerajaan Melayu di Sumatera Timur”, dalam Rogayah A. Hamid, et al. 2006. Kesultanan Melayu. Kuala Lumpur: Dewan Bahasa dan Pustaka.
 Tengku Luckman Sinar. 2007. Sejarah Medan tempo doeloe. Medan: Yayasan Kesultanan Serdang.
 Tuanku Luckman Sinar Basarshah II. 2003. Kronik mahkota Kesultanan Serdang. Medan: Yandira Agung.
 Tuanku Luckman Sinar Basarshah II. Tanpa tahun. Bangun dan runtuhnya kerajaan Melayu di Sumatera Timur. Medan: Tanpa nama penerbit.

External links
 The History of Sumatra by William Marsden, ca. 1800

History of Sumatra
Precolonial states of Indonesia
Islamic states in Indonesia
Deli
1632 establishments in Asia
Deli